Silvermine is a word used in numerous place names around the world.

Hong Kong
Silvermine Bay, a bay in Mui Wo, Lantau Island
Silver Mine Bay Beach, also known as Silvermine Bay Beach

Ireland
Silvermine Mountains, a mountain range in County Tipperary
Silvermines, a town in that mountain range, and also a defunct mining site in the area

South Africa

Silvermine Nature Reserve, part of the Table Mountain National Park in Cape Town

United States
Silvermine, Connecticut, a neighborhood in Fairfield County
Silver Mine, Missouri, an unincorporated community
Silvermine River, in Norwalk and New Canaan, Connecticut